Yang Li is a fashion designer based in London. He currently is the creative director of the label Shang Xia.

Early life 
Li was born in Beijing and resided there for the first 10 years of his life. After moving to Perth, Australia at the age of 10, Li spent his isolated teenage years playing basketball and skateboarding, two sports whose style and expression through clothing were his first introduction to fashion. Music has been the most profound obsession of Yang Li numerous collaborations have resulted and Li has led the way in championing underground and cult artists.

Career 
Li dabbled in music and briefly studied law to please his parents, but ultimately decided to pursue fashion. Upon receiving a scholarship to Central Saint Martins in 2007, Li moved to London to study fashion. After an internship under English designer Gareth Pugh, Li withdrew from the institution and moved to Belgium to intern under fashion designer Raf Simons. Following his experience described as "working in a creative kitchen", he launched his eponymous label in 2010.

Li's first collection "Zero Hour", released in 2010, was shown through a short film in collaboration with filmmaker and photographer Scott Trindle, in which articles of clothing were cut and repaired in varying degrees, which he saw as an act of "subtle rebellion".  He proceeded to release three more collections before his Fall/Winter 2013 Paris debut women's collection, a show dubbed "phenomenal" by Vogue. In 2014, he was shortlisted for the LVMH prize. CLCC SA, a Luxembourg fashion fund who had also funded Raf Simons, made investments in Yang Li in 2015. Li debuted his menswear line in January 2016 for Paris Fashion Week. In 2017, he launched his collaboration label SAMIZDAT.

Li is known for working with underground and cult musicians. For Li's Spring/Summer 2018 collection, the designer partnered with American singer-songwriter Michael Gira for a live performance to accompany his runway show at Palais de Tokyo in Paris. Other music collaborations include Blixa Bargeld of Einstürzende Neubauten,  Nick Cave and the Bad Seeds, Justin Broadrick, Keiji Haino, Jehnny Beth, Genesis Porridge, Psychic TV, Ramleh, KK Null, and Pharmakon.

Automatic show 
In 2018 Li, debuted the game changing "automatic show" the London-based designer decided to cede control of the FW19 visual presentation to his models. Li invited friends of the likes of Stoya, Asia Argento, Ali Michael, Ruby Aldridge, Lily McMenamy, Gaia Orgeas, Savages frontwoman Jehnny Beth, Rossy de Palma, Irina Shnitman, Sasha Melnychuk, Ellie Grace Cumming and Genesis P-Orridge to communicate the collection in their own way, began simultaneously posting selfies on Instagram yesterday from 10 different cities garbed in various looks of Li’s AW19 collection, all combined it was the whole of the collection. “Automatic Show” was an ingenious selfie salvo that relied completely on the participation of its models, Of course skirting convention runs the risk of going all but unnoticed; that didn’t happen, it created an instant viral digital fashion show 

Li says that he was inspired by the disjointed prose of American writer William S. Burroughs, who was known for championing an unconscious and "automatic" style of writing in his work. resulting in the following YANG LI AUTOMATIC MANIFESTO 

Li said:

The show was critically acclaimed and received overwhelming attention across the industry, models.com citing it as one of the coolest show of the season 

The following year in 2019, Li extended his exploration of formats with a 3D virtual meets live show in collaboration with The Jesus and Mary Chain. Yang Li presented his collection titled Greatest Hits: Automatic Show II at La Gaîté Lyrique. The show was a part concert, part visual experience through the digital projections which featured a 3D scanned version of Ruby Aldridge and Wolf Gillespie who modelled the collection in a virtual video game like environment, mirrored in a 360 view across the venue in collaboration with SHOWstudio and AGUSTA YR, the show also featured a live performance by The Jesus and Mary Chain.

Li's work has attracted a number of highly influential stockists, including SSENSE, Farfetch, Dover Street Market, and LUISAVIAROMA.

References 

Living people
1987 births